Slipčevići is a village in the municipality of Dobretići, Central Bosnia Canton, Bosnia and Herzegovina.

Demographics 
According to the 2013 census, its population was 13, all Croats.

References

Populated places in Dobretići